Henry Halsey Noyes (1910 – June 22, 2005) was an American writer, publisher, teacher, and distributor of Chinese books and magazines.

Biography
Born in Guangzhou, China, he was the son of Presbyterian missionaries William D. Noyes and Mary Stevenson. His mother was cousin to American statesman Adlai Stevenson. 

The family relocated to Canada in 1919. While a student at Humberside Collegiate Institute in Toronto, he won the Jardine Prize for Poetry in 1930. Henry earned an MFA in English literature at the University of Toronto (1936) and a Ph.D. at the University of London in the same subject in 1938).

In 1960, he founded China Books and Periodicals, Inc., in Chicago. The business later relocated to San Francisco and became America's largest distributor of printed materials from China.

Publications

References
 Publishers Weekly. China Takes Over China Books: The Longer Story  — Published November 10, 2003. This article is about the history and sale of Noyes' business, China Books.

1910 births
2005 deaths
American publishers (people)
Writers from Guangzhou
American expatriates in China
American expatriates in Canada